The Stern College for Women (SCW) is the undergraduate women's college of arts and sciences of Yeshiva University. It is located at the university's Israel Henry Beren Campus in the Murray Hill section of Manhattan.

The college provides programs in the sciences, social sciences, humanities, and Jewish studies, along with combined degree programs in dentistry, physical therapy, and engineering, among others. It grants the bachelor of arts degree, and also awards the Associate of Arts degree in Hebrew language, literature, and culture.  SCW's dual undergraduate curriculum includes the Basic Jewish Studies Program, a one- to two-year introduction to Bible, Jewish law, and Hebrew that allows students without traditional yeshiva or day school backgrounds to be integrated into SCW's regular Jewish studies courses.  The Rebecca Ivry Department of Jewish Studies offers courses ranging from elementary to advanced levels in Bible, Hebrew, Jewish history, Jewish philosophy, and Jewish laws and customs. The S. Daniel Abraham Honors Program stresses writing, critical analysis, cultural enrichment, individual mentoring, and the development of leadership skills.

SCW was established in 1954, based on a gift from the late industrialist Max Stern.  Today it serves more than 2,000 students from approximately two dozen U.S. states and a similar number of nations, including students registered at Syms School of Business. Karen Bacon, Ph.D., serves as the school's dean.

History

SCW opened in September 1954 with an incoming class of 32 students. The school was named in honor of Emanuel and Caroline Stern, the parents of Max Stern, who was a major contributor to the building of the college. SCW was founded as a response to YU’s post-WWII goals within the Orthodox Jewish community, one of which was to expand the impact of Orthodox Judaism on the greater American Jewish community Between 1945-1954, YU also opened a medical school, and graduate schools for Jewish social work, education, and psychology, as well as a community service department. Enrollment in SCW quickly grew to 500 students as the school offered diverse programs, which met the educational needs of students from different religious backgrounds. In the early years, the majority of students’ career goal was to be a school teacher, thus making it easy to develop a curriculum.

Karen Bacon, a 1964 graduate of SCW who had earned a PhD in microbiology from UCLA and worked as an assistant professor of biology at UCLA, was appointed the dean of SCW in 1977. She was the first woman to hold the position. In 1977, shortly after Rabbi Norman Lamm was appointed the president of YU, the administration worked to develop a more intensive, text-based Jewish studies program for SCW, including creating a Beit Midrash (Jewish study hall). On October 11, 1977, Rabbi Joseph Dov Soloveitchik delivered the introductory shiur (lecture) to inaugurate the program. In 1980, SCW restructured its Jewish studies department in an effort to offer students the opportunity to study classical Jewish texts. In 1987, the Sy Syms School of Business (since renamed Syms School of Business) was established. 

In 2001, the Graduate Program in Advanced Talmudic Studies (GPATS) was established. The program offers high-level Torah study, and graduates move on to serve as scholars in communities and schools in the United States and Israel. As of 2019, there are 977 students enrolled in SCW and 187 in the Syms School of Business.

Building

The school's building at 253 Lexington Avenue at the corner of East 35th Street in the Murray Hill was built in 1911 for the Packard Commercial School – which later became Packard Business College and Packard Junior College – at the cost of $250,000. In 1954 it was taken over by Yeshiva University for the inaugural class of the Stern College for Women.

Academics 
Majors offered include:

 Art History
 Biochemistry
 Biology
 Chemistry
 Economics
 Education
 English Literature
 History
 Jewish Studies

 Music
 Philosophy
 Physics
 Political Science
 Pre-engineering
 Psychology
 Sociology
 Speech Pathology/Audiology
 Studio Art

Combined and joint degree programs in business administration, dentistry, engineering, Jewish education, nursing, occupational therapy, optometry, physical therapy, physician assistant, podiatric medicine, and social work are available.

Minors offered include:

 American Studies
 Art
 Biology
 Chemistry
 Computer Science
 Economics
 English
 History
 Jewish Studies

 Mathematics
 Music
 Philosophy
 Physics
 Political Science
 Psychology
 Sociology
 Spanish
 Women's Studies

Students also may select a business minor offered through Syms School of Business.

See also 
 List of Jewish universities and colleges in the United States

References
Notes

External links 

The Basic Jewish Studies Program
Observer

Jewish universities and colleges in the United States
Orthodox Jewish universities and colleges
Universities and colleges in Manhattan
Women's universities and colleges in the United States
Yeshiva University
1954 establishments in New York City
History of women in New York City